The Little Willies is the self-titled debut album by The Little Willies. The album was released after band member Norah Jones had achieved international stardom as a solo artist.

The album features covers of songs by Hank Williams ("I’ll Never Get Out"), Willie Nelson ("Gotta Get Drunk" and "Night Life"), Fred Rose ("Roly Poly"), Townes Van Zandt ("No Place to Fall") and Kris Kristofferson ("Best of All Possible Worlds"). Fusing cover material with a few of their own original compositions, the band delivers what a review by John Metzger describes as "an affable set that occasionally strikes pure gold."

Track listing

Charts

Weekly charts

Year-end charts

Notes

2006 debut albums
Norah Jones albums